Camp Concordia was a prisoner-of-war camp that operated from 1943–1945.  Its location is two miles north and one mile east of Concordia, Kansas. The camp was used primarily for German Army prisoners during World War II who were captured in battles that took place in Africa.

Camp Concordia was the largest POW camp in Kansas, holding over 4,000 prisoners (some sources cite as high as 8,000 prisoners). The camp consisted of a complex of 300 buildings and was staffed by 800 United States soldiers.

Daily life
The prisoners arrived at Camp Concordia by train.  Authorities believed the soldiers could provide useful labor for agriculture, and, almost immediately, the Germans started working with local farmers.

Interactions between prisoners
At least two reported cases of executions are recorded, both were made by prisoners on fellow prisoners (some of whom were Gestapo agents).  When conclusive evidence arose, the offenders were tried and sentenced to the federal penitentiary at Leavenworth.

Interaction between locals
"Difficulties between POWs and local residents were few, and in fact friendships formed", stated Lowell May, president of the camp's preservation society. "Only a handful of escape attempts occurred, none successful."  Life at the camp was easy compared with the war in Europe. Prisoners played outdoor sports, listened to band performances and took courses offered by the University of Kansas.

Famous prisoners 
 Karl Bracher, historian.
 Harald Deilmann, architect and author.
 Reinhard Mohn, owner of the transnational media corporation Bertelsmann AG.

Return to Germany
The prisoners headed back to Germany in the autumn of 1945, some of them harboring pleasant memories of Kansas. Franz Kramer of Gundelfingen, Germany, said: "There was no reason to criticize American authorities. The prisoners felt that they were well treated. We learned a little of the American way of life and saw part of the vast country."

Later years

Once the POW camp closed, one of the buildings, Building T-9, was on a list acquired by the Federal Land Bank on June 7, 1947. In October 1947, the City of Concordia purchased 166.7 acres of camp acreage, including buildings, with the intent of establishing a park and re-locating the Cloud County fairgrounds to the site. Plans for the park never came to pass and the city eventually sold Building T-9 as well as other buildings and acreage. T-9 was subsequently used as a skating rink, hog farm, canoe factory, and during the 1960s, as storage for a horse racetrack called Thundercloud Park located on the camp property.

The camp today

Several structures of the camp remain, including a prison warehouse used for storage, an officers club, and a restored guard tower. Only the guard tower is easily accessible to the public. The land is now used primarily for farming, although some houses have been built on the land as well. The original guardhouse remains and has been restored. Today, correspondence continues between former POWs, their relatives and Concordia residents.

Camp records have been transferred and maintained at the Cloud County Historical Museum in Concordia. On display at the museum are also many items of interest about Camp Concordia including several original paintings created by prisoners at Camp Concordia.

References

Further reading
 Bell, Rachel Lowrey (1998a). A Proud Past... A Pictorial History of Concordia, Kansas. Marceline, Missouri: D-Books Publishing.
 Carlson, Lewis H., 1997, We Were Each Other’s Prisoners. Basic Books, New York.
 Emery, Janet Pease (1970a). It Takes People to Make a Town, Salina, Kansas. Arrow Printing Company. Library of Congress number 75–135688.
 Gansberg, Judith, Stalag USA, the remarkable story of German POWs in America, Crowell, 1978
 Krammer, Arnold, 1979, Nazi Prisoners of War in America. Stein and Day, New York.
 May, Lowell A., 1995, Camp Concordia: German POWs in the Midwest. Sunflower University Press, Manhattan, Kansas.
 Taylor, Pamela Howe (2003). The Germans We Trusted: Stories Which Had To Be Told.... Lutterworth Press. .
 Thompson, Glenn, 1993, Prisoners on the Plains: German POWs in America. Phelps County Historical Society, Holdrege, Nebraska.

External links
 Photo tour of Camp Concordia
 Camp Concordia: German POWs in the Midwest by Lowell A. May
 Roadside America review of Camp Concordia
 Camp Concordia, KansasTravel.org

Buildings and structures in Cloud County, Kansas
World War II prisoner of war camps in the United States
Military facilities in Kansas
Tourist attractions in Cloud County, Kansas
Defunct horse racing venues in the United States
1943 establishments in Kansas
1945 disestablishments in Kansas